4-Chloro-4-deoxygalactose (chlorodeoxygalactose) is chlorinated derivative of the sugar galactose. It is one of the two components comprising the disaccharide sucralose, a commercial sugar substitute. It is a hydrolysis product when sucralose is degraded.

References

Organochlorides
Monosaccharide derivatives